In the Custody of Strangers is a 1982 American made-for-television drama film. It was directed by Robert Greenwald and written by Jennifer Miller.  The film stars Martin Sheen, Jane Alexander and Emilio Estevez, the latter in his feature film debut. The film was nominated for the Golden Globe Award for Best Mini-Series Or Motion Picture Made for Television but lost to Brideshead Revisited.

Plot
Based on a true story. Danny Caldwell is an angry small-town teen whose father, Frank, has been laid off and can't find a decent job. His mother, Sandy, works in order to provide for the family of five. Danny, frustrated with the town, tries to get work or leave the town to find a decent job, but often butts heads with Frank, whose staunch perception is that allowing his son to go to work is a threat to his masculinity. In other words, a father should provide for the family, not his wife, and certainly not the boy.

So, Danny and Frank are frequently at odds and, as a result, the teen indulges in a lot of trouble.  One night, while Danny is out joyriding while drunk, he hits a police car, and it lands him in jail. Frank supposes that maybe a night in jail is just what Danny needs to straighten up. However, due to events that happen while Danny is incarcerated, he ends up spending six weeks in jail on assault charges.

Meanwhile, Frank gets a job in Ohio and the family has to move. At Danny's trial, the assault charges are dropped and he is charged only with drunk driving and operating without a license. He is sentenced to time served and released. His parents realize the mistake of leaving their son in jail, and tell the people in the courtroom that they really need to change how they treat children that come to them. Danny returns home to his family, but is forever changed by his time in jail.

Cast
 Martin Sheen as Frank Caldwell
 Jane Alexander as Sandy Caldwell
 Emilio Estevez as Danny Caldwell
 Kenneth McMillan as Albert C. Caruso
 Ed Lauter as Judge Halloran
 Matt Clark as Mike Raines
 Virginia Kiser as Dr. Forman
 Jon Van Ness as Corky
 John Hancock as Judge Bennett
 Deborah Foreman as Karen
 Susan Peretz as Big Faye
 Peter Jurasik as Andy Barnes
 Judyann Elder as Marni Blake, Prosecutor

External links
 

1982 films
1982 television films
ABC network original films
American drama television films
1982 drama films
Films directed by Robert Greenwald
1980s English-language films